The southern grey shrike is a former species of shrike that has been split or reassigned to the following:

 some southern subspecies of the great grey shrike, Lanius excubitor
 Iberian grey shrike, Lanius meridionalis
 Steppe grey shrike, Lanius pallidirostris

Birds by common name